Michael David Grimes (born November 25, 1966 in Los Angeles, California) is a Managing Director and Head of Global Technology Investment Banking at Morgan Stanley.

In 2002, Grimes was first named to Forbes’ Midas List of the top dealmakers in technology and life sciences venture capital and investment banking, debuting as the second ranked investment banker and eighteenth overall; Grimes has been the top ranked investment banker on the Midas list in 2004, 2005, 2006, and 2007, and the second ranked technology investment banker in 2008. In July 2010, Grimes was named to Fortune’s “50 Smartest People In Tech.” 

Grimes has also been named by AlwaysOn to their “Power List” of technology dealmakers, Institutional Investor’s November 2006 “40 under 40” list of investment bankers who represent “the way Wall Street is evolving today”, the New York Times “Facebook of Wall Street’s future”, Dealmaker magazine’s “Top 50 Rainmakers”.

Biography

Early life and education
Michael Grimes attended Polytechnic School in Pasadena, California and the University of California, Berkeley, where he received degrees in Electrical Engineering and Computer Science.  He interned as a communications systems engineer at Hughes Aircraft Company in the Space and Communications Group in 1985, as an information systems engineer at Pacific Bell in 1986, and was a software programmer and consultant at Grimes Surveying & Mapping Inc. (his father's company).

During his junior year at Polytechnic, Michael and his fellow students found hundreds of thousands of small slips of paper printed with the words MIKE GRIMES scattered all over the campus. Current (2012) students at Poly have stated that these enigmatic messages continue to show up on occasion in lockers, behind furniture, and within books in the school library. Grimes denied any knowledge of who distributed the messages, or why they may have done so. There were no student body elections at the time of the incident.

Grimes' sister, Laura M. Grimes, Ph.D., is a Notre Dame-educated theologian.

Career
Upon graduation in 1987, Grimes joined Salomon Brothers (now part of Citigroup) in technology investment banking, and in 1992 joined Bear Stearns as a Vice President in technology banking. In 1995, Grimes was recruited by Frank Quattrone to join Morgan Stanley as a Vice President in their Menlo Park office, focused on technology banking. In April 1996, Quattrone and a number of deputies departed for Deutsche Morgan Grenfell, leaving Grimes to stay at Morgan Stanley. Grimes then worked under Cordell Spencer and Dhiren Shah over the next few years and helped rebuild the West Coast Technology Investment Banking business. In 2005 Grimes and Paul Chamberlain were elevated to Co-Heads of Global Technology Banking.

Michael Grimes has been involved with hundreds of technology investment banking transactions aggregating over $100 billion in value, including a number of high-profile IPOs, mergers and acquisitions, equity and debt financings.  Most notable were Facebook's $16 billion initial public offering, and Google’s $1.9 billion initial public offering, completed with an auction format. Grimes has also been involved with technology M&A transactions such as Seagate Technology’s $20.5 billion 3-way merger and spinoff transaction with Veritas Software, Silver Lake Partners and Texas Pacific Group, Hewlett-Packard’s $13.6 billion split-up into HP and Agilent (at the time the Agilent IPO was the largest initial public offering in Silicon Valley history), Oracle’s $5.8 billion acquisition of Siebel Systems.

References

1966 births
American investment bankers
Systems engineers
UC Berkeley College of Engineering alumni
Living people